Phlox douglasii, common name tufted phlox or Columbia phlox, is a species of perennial herb belonging to the family Polemoniaceae. In the past it has been mistakenly included within the species Phlox caespitosa.

Description
Phlox douglasii can reach a height of about 10 cm. Flowers may be purple, pink, pale lavender or magenta-red, about 1.5 cm across, usually in terminal clusters. They bloom from April to August.

Distribution
Phlox douglasii is native to northwestern United States.

Habitat

Cultivars
The following hybrid cultivars have received the Royal Horticultural Society's Award of Garden Merit:
 'Boothman's Variety' (pink, darker eye)
 'Crackerjack' (magenta)
 'Iceberg' (white)
 'Kelly's Eye' (pale pink)
 'Red Admiral' (deep pink)

References

Biolib
Royal Horticultural Society

douglasii